In molecular biology, Urothelial cancer associated 1 (non-protein coding), also known as UCA1, is a long non-coding RNA, it is upregulated in bladder cancer. It is believed to function in regulation of embryonic development and in bladder cancer invasion and progression. It regulates the expression of several genes involved in tumourgenesis and/or embryonic development.

See also
 Long noncoding RNA

References

Further reading

Non-coding RNA